Castelnaudary is a railway station in Castelnaudary, Occitanie, France. The station opened on 22 April 1857 and is on the Bordeaux–Sète line. It is at the southern end of the town, about a 5–10-minute walk from the centre. The station is served by Intercités (long distance, as well as night train) and TER (local) services operated by the SNCF.

Train services
The following services currently call at Castelnaudary:
night services (Intercités de nuit) Paris–Narbonne–Cerbère
local service (TER Occitanie) Toulouse–Carcassonne–Narbonne

References

Railway stations in Aude
Railway stations in France opened in 1857